Ansbach American Middle/High School (AMHS) in Bavaria, Germany is a part of the Department of Defense Education Activity (DoDEA). It is a public school serving the children of American Army units, grades 6–12. The school is certified by the North Central Association of Colleges and Secondary Schools. The mascot is a cougar.

See also 
DoDEA
Bavaria District (DoDDS-Europe)

References

External links
Ansbach Middle High School Official Site

Ansbach Middle High School Google Site

American international schools in Germany
International schools in Bavaria
Schools in Middle Franconia
Education in Ansbach
Buildings and structures in Ansbach
Educational institutions established in 1973
1973 establishments in West Germany